According to the Grove Dictionary of Music and Musicians, there are two kinds of piano duet: "those for two players at one instrument, and those in which each of the two pianists has an instrument to themselves."  In American usage the former is often referred to as "piano four hands". Grove notes that the one-piano duet has the larger repertory, but has come to be regarded as a modest, domestic form of music-making by comparison with "the more glamorous two-piano duet". The latter is more often referred to as a piano duo.

The piano duet came to popularity in the second half of the 18th century. Mozart played duets as a child with his sister, and later wrote sonatas for four hands at one piano; Schubert was another composer who composed for the genre, notably with his Fantasy in F minor, D. 940. Jane Bellingham in The Oxford Companion to Music lists other composers who wrote piano duets, including Brahms, Dvořák, Grieg, Debussy, Stravinsky, and Bartók. In the late nineteenth and early twentieth centuries French piano duets included Bizet's Jeux d'enfants, Fauré's Dolly Suite and Ravel's Ma mère l'oye.

See also
 List of compositions for piano duo
 List of classical piano duos (performers)

References

Duets